Bethausen (Banat Swabian: Pettlenhaas; often Romanianized Betleaz) is a commune in Timiș County, Romania. It is composed of six villages: Bethausen (commune seat), Cladova, Cliciova, Cutina, Leucușești and Nevrincea.

Geography 
Bethausen is located in the northeast of Timiș County, on the right bank of Bega River, 26 km from Lugoj and 20 km from Făget.

The relief is characterized by the predominance of the smooth surfaces of the Banat Plain, which extends as a gulf into the hills on Bega Valley. In the north, the commune's territory includes the last extensions of the Lipova Piedmont, and in the southeast the Făget Hills, located at the foot of the Poiana Ruscă Massif, from which they are separated by a chain of contact micro-depressions.

The climate has a temperate character, with warm summers, not too cold winters, quite early springs and sometimes very long autumns.

The vegetation is rich in species. The plains and the meadows are used for various crops: wheat, barley, oat, corn, cabbage, melons, potatoes, orchards, etc. The commune's territory is part of the vegetation area of deciduous forests (Turkey oak, Hungarian oak, sessile oak, field maple, ash, black locust, etc.).

History 
Bethausen is one of the youngest villages in Banat. It was founded in 1883 by colonization with Germans coming from Zichandorf, on the hearth of the former Romanian village Becliza or Betlinești. Germans gave it the name Bethausen, after the old name Betlinești; Hungarians called it Bethlenháza ("Bethlen's house"), and Romanians Betleaz. In 1884 they built a Roman Catholic church here. By 1890 the commune was part of the district of Belinț. Until 1990 it was a predominantly German locality, but after their exodus to Germany, the Romanians became the majority.

Demographics 

Bethausen had a population of 3,057 inhabitants at the 2011 census, up 1% from the 2002 census. Most inhabitants are Romanians (90.97%), larger minorities being represented by Ukrainians (4.84%) and Hungarians (1.24%). For 2.26% of the population, ethnicity is unknown. By religion, most inhabitants are Orthodox (78.02%), but there are also minorities of Pentecostals (13.48%), Roman Catholics (2.49%) and Adventists (2%). For 2.29% of the population, religious affiliation is unknown.

References 

Communes in Timiș County
Localities in Romanian Banat